Halstead High School is a public high school located in Halstead, Kansas, United States, serving students in grades 9–12.  It is operated by Halstead–Bentley USD 440 school district.  The school primarily serves the towns of Halstead and Bentley, Kansas. The school colors are royal blue and white with black commonly used as a complementary color.

Extracurricular activities

Athletics
Halstead High School athletic teams compete as a 3A school under the Kansas State High School Activities Association. They are a part of the CKL League (Central Kansas League), which is made up of Halstead, Haven, Hesston, Hillsboro, Hoisington, Larned, Lyons, Nickerson, Pratt, and Smoky Valley. Athletic programs are offered in baseball, men's and women's basketball, cross-country, football, golf, softball, track and field, wrestling, and volleyball. Halstead has hosted annual athletic events including the Halstead Wrestling Invitational since 1975, the Adolph Rupp Basketball Tournament since 1970 and the Conrad Nightingale Invitational Track Meet since 1971. Halstead won the 3A state championship in boys' basketball in 2001 and 2018, boys' golf in 1981 and boys' cross country in 2014, 2015 and 2017.

State Championships

Clubs
The Halstead Debate team achieved a state championship in 2003.   Artistic programs are offered in band, choir, and drama.  Debate and forensics teams are offered, as well as a Scholar's Bowl team.

Notable alumni
 Bobby Berger, bull rider
 Dennis Latimore, played college basketball at University of Arizona and the University of Notre Dame
 Conrad Nightingale, competed in the 1968 Summer Olympics
 Jim Roper, winner of the first NASCAR race
 Adolph Rupp, Hall of Fame basketball coach at the University of Kentucky

See also
 Kansas State Department of Education
 Kansas State High School Activities Association
 List of high schools in Kansas
 List of unified school districts in Kansas

References

External links
 School website
 School district
 USD 440 School District Boundary Map, KDOT

Schools in Harvey County, Kansas
Public high schools in Kansas